This is a list of books by or about George H. W. Bush.

By Bush
Looking Forward: An Autobiography, (1988), 
A World Transformed, (1998), cowritten with Brent Scowcroft, 
All the Best: My Life in Letters and Other Writings, (1999),

About Bush
 
George Bush: The Life of a Lone Star Yankee (1997)
Kelley, Kitty, The Family: The Real Story of the Bush Dynasty (2004), 
Bush, George Walker, 41: A Portrait of My Father, (2014), 
White House Usher: Stories from the Inside, by Christopher Emery (2017),

References

Bibliographies of people
 
Lists of books
Political bibliographies
Bush, George H. W.
George H. W. Bush-related lists